The Nendo or Santa Cruz tube-nosed fruit bat (Nyctimene sanctacrucis) is a megabat from the Santa Cruz Group of the Solomon Islands, near the eastern limit of the distribution of tube-nosed fruit bats.

The species is known from a single female specimen collected in the late 19th century and donated to the Australian Museum, Sydney, in 1892. It apparently was last seen on the island of Nendo in 1907. It has previously been treated as extinct but is currently classified as data deficient by the IUCN due to continuing concerns about the species' taxonomic validity.

References

Further reading

Nyctimene (genus)
Bats of Oceania
Endemic fauna of the Solomon Islands
Mammals of the Solomon Islands
Extinct animals of Oceania
Mammal extinctions since 1500
Mammals described in 1931